Nikitari is a village in Cyprus. It is located in the Nicosia District.

UNESCO site— Panagia tis Asinou 
Very close to Nikitari (5 km) is the church of Asinou, Panagia tis Asinou,also called Panagia Forviotissa. It is a 12th-century church, dedicated to the Virgin Mary, with frescoes of the 12th century and later periods, considered to be among the finest examples of Byzantine mural painting in the island of Cyprus. It was designated a UNESCO World Heritage Site in 1985 along with nine other Painted Churches in the Troödos Region, because of their outstanding artwork and testimony to the history of Byzantine rule in Cyprus.

References

 Statistical Service of the Republic of Cyprus, 2001 Population Census, MS Excel document 

Communities in Nicosia District